Tibor Gazdag (born 7 August 1991) is a Hungarian handballer who plays for Csurgói KK and the Hungarian national team.

References

External links
Oregfiuk.hu
Cskk.hu

1991 births
Living people
Hungarian male handball players
Sportspeople from Debrecen